Walter Wottitz (died November 1, 1986) was an American cinematographer. He won an Academy Award for Best Cinematography for the film The Longest Day. Wottitz died in November 1986.

Selected filmography 
 That's Not the Way to Die (1946)
 Love Is at Stake (1957)
 The Longest Day (1962; co-won with Jean Bourgoin)
 The Gardener of Argenteuil (1966)
 Under the Sign of the Bull (1969)
 The Widow Couderc (1971)

References

External links 

Year of birth missing
1986 deaths
American cinematographers
Best Cinematographer Academy Award winners